NH 43 may refer to:

 National Highway 43 (India)
 New Hampshire Route 43, United States